The Agosta-class submarine is a class of diesel-electric fast-attack submarine developed and constructed by the French DCNS in the 1970s to succeed the  submarines. The submarines have served in the French Navy as well as exported to the navies of Spain and Pakistan. It also used by Royal Malaysian Navy for the training purpose. They were replaced in French service by the  nuclear attack submarines but are still in active service with the navies of Spain and Pakistan. The French Navy grouped this model of submarine in their most capable class as an océanique, meaning "ocean-going."

The Agosta class is named for its lead unit, which in turn was named for the Battle of Augusta of 22 April 1676.

Ships

French Navy
built by Arsenal de Cherbourg
 Agosta (S 620) – completed 1977 – decommissioned 1997
 Bévéziers (S 621) – completed 1977 – decommissioned 1998
 La Praya (S 622) – completed 1978 – decommissioned 2000
  (S 623) – completed 1978 – decommissioned 2001(transferred to Royal Malaysian Navy).

Spanish Navy
built by Cartagena dockyard
 Galerna (S 71) – completed 1983 – in service
 Siroco (S 72) – completed 1983 – decommissioned 2012
 Mistral (S 73) – completed 1985 – decommissioned 2020
  (S 74) – completed 1985 – in service

Pakistan Navy

 PNS/M Hashmat (S135) – completed in 1979, originally named Astrant
 PNS/M Hurmat (S136) – completed in 1980, originally named Adventurous

On 10 September 1974, South Africa announced to expand its submarine arm by entering in defence talks with France to acquire the Agosta-70-class submarines. South African Prime Minister P. W. Botha engaged in discussion with acquiring two Agosta-70-class submarines with French President Valéry d'Estaing, and had Capt. L. J. Woodburne as the project-manager of acquisition of Agosta-70 program in South African Navy. Dubigeon-Normandie, the French contractor, built two Agosta-70 class submarine. However, France denied to order of delivery to South African Navy following the implementation of Resolution 418 (an arms embargo) by the United Nations.

In 1983–1985, the class of submarines were deployed in Arabian Sea to deter the actions of the larger Indian Navy in seaborne theatre. As part of the Cold War operation, they were deployed in the Arabian Sea and later embarked on being deployed on long-range mission to test depth and submerged endurance in Indian Ocean.

Variants 
The Agosta-90B-class submarines is an improved version with modern systems, better battery with longer endurance, deeper diving capability, lower acoustic cavitation and better automatic control (reducing crew from 54 to 36). It can be equipped with the MESMA air-independent propulsion (AIP) system. It is capable of carrying a combined load up to 16 torpedoes, SM39 Exocet, and seaborne nuclear cruise missiles.

The submarines were built through the technology transfer by France to Pakistan that resulted in complicated and lengthy negotiations between the Benazir Bhutto government and the Mitterrand administration in 1992, and signed with the Chirac administration in 1992. The Agosta–90Bs were chosen over the British Upholder/Victoria class and the project was initially aimed at $520 million but the programme of technology transfer costed $950 million, for which France first provided loans that were paid in five to six years. In 2000, France gave Pakistan the licence to offer commercial production of the submarines to potential customers.

The SM39 was test-fired from a Khalid-class submarine in 2001.
 PNS/M Khalid (S137) – built in France by DCN Cherbourg, completed in 1999
 PNS/M Saad  (S138) – assembled in Pakistan with French assistance, completed in 2002
 PNS/M Hamza (S139) – built in Pakistan with French assistance, commissioned 14 August 2006
In March 2018, DCNS, the original builder lost a bidding competition to the Turkish firm STM, for mid-life upgrades to the 3 class subs. The upgrades will replace "the submarine’s entire sonar suite, periscope systems, command and control system, radar and electronic support systems. HAVELSAN- [Turkey’s state-controlled military software company] and ASELSAN [Turkish defense contractor]-made systems will also be exported as part of the project.” As well as install a "SharpEye low probability-of-intercept (LPI) radar system aboard" and "make modifications on the pressure hull, the most critical structure in a submarine, by carrying out system-to-system and platform-to-system integrations for various systems, to be provided by local and foreign companies.”

See also 

 List of submarines of France
 List of submarine classes in service

References

External links
 Naval Technology page on Agosta 90B

Submarine classes
 
A
Ship classes of the French Navy